The commune of Cankuzo is a commune of Cankuzo Province in north-eastern Burundi. The capital lies at Cankuzo.

References

Communes of Burundi
Cankuzo Province